Jorge Luiz Matheus de Almeida, best known as Jorge Luiz (born 12 August 1965) is a Brazilian former  football (soccer) player, who played as a defender, best known for his performances for Vasco da Gama and Flamengo. He was born in Rio de Janeiro.

Honours
Vasco da Gama
Campeonato Carioca: 1992, 1993, 1994

Flamengo
 Campeonato Carioca: 1996

Botafogo
 Campeonato Carioca: 1997

Palmeiras
 Copa Mercosul: 1998

References

1965 births
Living people
Brazilian footballers
Campeonato Brasileiro Série A players
CR Vasco da Gama players
Association football defenders
Footballers from Rio de Janeiro (city)